Steve Douglas may refer to:
Steve Douglas (musician) (1938–1993), American saxophonist, flautist and clarinetist
Steve Douglas (darts player) (born 1977), English darts player
Steve Douglas (skateboarder) (born 1967), professional skateboarder, company owner and industry mogul
Steve Douglas (sportscaster) (c. 1911–1981), Canadian sportscaster
Steve Douglas (presenter), son of Eric Morley, founder of the Miss World pageant

See also
Stephen Douglas (disambiguation)